Margaret J. "Peg" Mallery (born October 12, 1967) is an American rower. She competed in the women's eight event at the 1988 Summer Olympics.

References

External links
 

1967 births
Living people
American female rowers
Olympic rowers of the United States
Rowers at the 1988 Summer Olympics
Place of birth missing (living people)
21st-century American women